Abijah Hunt (1762-1811) was an American merchant, planter and banker in the Natchez District.

Early life
Abijah Hunt was born in 1762 in New Jersey. Two of his brothers were Jeremiah Hunt and Jess Hunt.

Career
Abijah moved from New Jersey to Cincinnati, Ohio to work as a merchant supplying the United States Army soldiers stationed at Fort Washington there. He worked with his brothers (Jeremiah and Jess), buying goods on credit in Philadelphia and New York City. Wagoners hauled the goods to Pittsburgh, Pennsylvania where they were loaded onto flatboats and floated down the Ohio River to be sold in Cincinnati. He made a small fortune providing supplies to the soldiers in Cincinnati.

In 1795 Abijah helped his cousin, John Wesley Hunt, set up a similar merchant business in nearby Lexington, Kentucky. The Hunts obtained some of their goods by trading with each other. John would send Abijah "bacon, butter, cheese, salt, tobacco, whiskey, and horses" from Lexington, while Abijah would send John "leather, shoes, and nails" from Cincinnati.

In 1798, Abijah moved to the Natchez District of Mississippi. He invested some of his money in land, developing cotton plantations in Adams, Jefferson and Claiborne counties. With Elijah Smith, he opened general stores and public cotton gins in the market towns of Natchez, Washington, Greenville, Port Gibson, Big Black, and Bayou Pierre. By 1805, Hunt was the largest merchant in Mississippi. Hunt and Smith charged a ten percent commission to planters for processing their cotton at his public cotton gins. Additionally, the Hunt and Smith firm operated a cotton brokerage and transported logs and cotton bales to market.  Thus, Abijah created a kind of vertical monopoly, making a profit in every area of the cotton business: growing it on his plantations, processing it at his public cotton gins, and selling it through his brokerage.

Hunt was involved in other business enterprises. In 1799, Abijah was appointed as Deputy US Postmaster of the Mississippi Territory. In this capacity, he made sure that all mail from Natchez would reach Nashville, Tennessee. In 1809, he was a co-founder of the Bank of Mississippi.

Abijah sold a couple of his plantations. In 1807, Winthrop Sargent bought Bellevue Plantation in Adams County from Hunt and renamed it Gloucester.  In 1808, Hunt sold a plantation on the Bayou Pierre in Claiborne County, complete with 60 or 61 slaves.

Abijah lived in Greenville (now defunct) in Jefferson County. Politically, he was a Federalist. He hired his nephew, David Hunt, also from New Jersey, to work in one of his stores.

Death
Hunt died in 1811 at the age of 49, shot during a duel with Democratic Republican opponent George Poindexter. The latter went on to have a successful political career, serving as Governor of Mississippi. The inventory of Abijah's estate listed his 60 slaves by name. Hunt's nephew, David Hunt, inherited his land and businesses, selling the stores to buy more land. David gradually built this inheritance into his own much larger inventory of plantations. He eventually owned 25 plantations, which included Homewood, Lansdowne, and Buena Vista. Consequently, David Hunt became one of the twelve millionaires in the Natchez area in the antebellum era.

References

1762 births
1811 deaths
People from New Jersey
Businesspeople from Cincinnati
People from Natchez, Mississippi
American merchants
American planters
American bankers
Cotton
American slave owners
American duellists